The Netherlands men's national wheelchair basketball team is the men's wheelchair basketball side that represents the Netherlands in the major wheelchair basketball competitions. 

It has thirteen European medals including a title, two world finals and the Paralympic title in its fifth final (won in 1992 in front of Germany and France) on its record.

Competitions

Summer Paralympics

World Championship

European Championship

See also
Netherlands national basketball team

References

IPC Historical Results Database - General Search, International Paralympic Committee (IPC)
The information from the International Paralympic Committee (IPC) website is based on sources which does not present all information from earlier paralympic games (1960-1984), such as relay and team members. (Per 5 March 2011)
Paralympics - Results, International Wheelchair Basketball Federation (IWBF)

External links

National men's wheelchair basketball teams
Wheelchair basketball